The Museum of Childhood is a museum which houses a collection of children's toys and playthings, situated on the Royal Mile, in  Edinburgh, Scotland. It was the first museum in the world to specialise in the history of childhood.

History 
The collection, which ranges from the 18th to the 21st century, was originally the work of Patrick Murray (1908-1981), an Edinburgh Councillor and passionate collector of toys and childhood memorabilia. It first opened to the public in 1955 and moved to its present home on Edinburgh's royal mile in 1957 housed in what was formerly the Salvation Army's hall.

In 1986 the museum expanded into neighbouring properties to expand the floor and display space. Highlight items in the collection include a teddy bear brought to the UK by a child on the Kindertransport, a dollhouse with working lighting and plumbing systems and a Queen Anne doll from 1740.

Today 
In 2017 the museum underwent a major refurbishment including the installation of new display cabinets and lighting for exhibits. The refurbishment also saw the installation of a new digital photo gallery which offers a look at the changing way children grew up across the twentieth century. In 2017 it was estimated that the museum had around 225,000 visitors per year and it had around 60,000 objects in its collection.

The museum has a number of interactive spaces to encourage play amongst younger visitors. Admission to the museum is free and it is run and owned by City of Edinburgh Council.

The collection includes one of the Scottish Government's baby boxes as of 2018. This is a maternity package offered to all new parents in Scotland.

Gallery

See also
 Trinity Apse and Brass Rubbing Centre, Chalmers Close

References

Museums in Edinburgh
Royal Mile
Children's museums in the United Kingdom
Museums established in 1955
1955 establishments in Scotland
Toy museums in Scotland
Childhood in Scotland